Chrysichthys is a genus of claroteid catfishes native to Africa.  Two fossil species are known. Chrysichthys macrotis, Van Neer, 1994, is known from the Miocene-Pliocene of the Albertine Rift in Uganda and Chrysichthys mahengeensis, Murray & Budney, 2003, is known from the Eocene of Mahenge, Tanzania.

Species
There are currently 42 recognized species in this genus:
 Chrysichthys acsiorum Hardman, 2008
 Chrysichthys aluuensis Risch, 1985
 Chrysichthys ansorgii Boulenger, 1910
 Chrysichthys auratus (É. Geoffroy Saint-Hilaire, 1809)
 Chrysichthys bocagii Boulenger, 1910
 Chrysichthys brachynema Boulenger, 1900 (Kibonde, salmontail catfish)
 Chrysichthys brevibarbis (Boulenger, 1899)
 Chrysichthys cranchii (Leach, 1818) (Kokuni, Kamba)
 Chrysichthys dageti Risch, 1992
 Chrysichthys delhezi Boulenger, 1899
 Chrysichthys dendrophorus (Poll, 1966)
 Chrysichthys depressus (Nichols & Griscom, 1917)
 Chrysichthys duttoni Boulenger, 1905
 Chrysichthys habereri Steindachner, 1912
 Chrysichthys helicophagus T. R. Roberts & D. J. Stewart, 1976
 Chrysichthys hildae Bell-Cross, 1973 (Hilda's grunter)
 Chrysichthys johnelsi Daget, 1959
 Chrysichthys laticeps Pellegrin, 1932
 Chrysichthys levequei Risch, 1988
 Chrysichthys longibarbis (Boulenger, 1899)
 Chrysichthys longidorsalis Risch & Thys van den Audenaerde, 1981
 Chrysichthys longipinnis (Boulenger, 1899) (Aluminum catfish)
 Chrysichthys mabusi Boulenger, 1905
 Chrysichthys macropterus Boulenger, 1920
 Chrysichthys maurus (Valenciennes, 1840)
 Chrysichthys nigrodigitatus (Lacépède, 1803) (Bagrid catfish)
 Chrysichthys nyongensis Risch & Thys van den Audenaerde, 1985
 Chrysichthys ogooensis (Pellegrin, 1900)
 Chrysichthys okae Fowler, 1949
 Chrysichthys ornatus Boulenger, 1902 (Ornate bagrid)
 Chrysichthys persimilis Günther, 1899
 Chrysichthys polli Risch, 1987
 Chrysichthys praecox Hardman & Stiassny, 2008
 Chrysichthys punctatus Boulenger, 1899
 Chrysichthys rueppelli Boulenger, 1907
 Chrysichthys sharpii Boulenger, 1901 (Shovelnose catfish)
 Chrysichthys teugelsi Risch, 1987
 Chrysichthys thonneri Steindachner, 1912
 Chrysichthys thysi Risch, 1985
 Chrysichthys turkana Hardman, 2008
 Chrysichthys uniformis Pellegrin, 1922
 Chrysichthys wagenaari Boulenger, 1899
 Chrysichthys walkeri Günther, 1899

References

Claroteidae
Fish of Africa
Catfish genera
Freshwater fish genera
Taxa named by Pieter Bleeker
Taxonomy articles created by Polbot